The  Copa Governo do Estado de Sergipe was a tournament organized by Federação Sergipana de Futebol in order to decide which club would represent the state at the Copa do Brasil.

List of champions

References

Football in Sergipe